Gejza Baranyai (born 13 November 1983 in Marcelová) is a Slovak football player who currently plays for MŠO Štúrovo. He is of Hungarian descent.

Career
Born in Marcelová, Baranyai began playing football for Štúrova. He next signed for Slovak Superliga side AS Trenčín, and went on loan to LAFC Lučenec. In January 2008, the 24-year-old was transferred to FC Tescoma Zlín of the Czech Gambrinus liga.

References

External links

 

1983 births
Living people
Slovak footballers
Association football forwards
AS Trenčín players
MŠK Novohrad Lučenec players
Slovak Super Liga players
Czech First League players
FC Fastav Zlín players
Expatriate footballers in the Czech Republic
People from Komárno District
Sportspeople from the Nitra Region
Slovak expatriate footballers
Slovak expatriate sportspeople in the Czech Republic
Hungarians in Slovakia